Howard Norton Cook (1901–1980) was an American artist, particularly known for his wood engravings and murals. Cook spent much of the 1920s in Europe and returned to live in Taos, New Mexico.

Cook first came to Taos, New Mexico in 1926 commissioned by The Forum to make a series of woodcuts to illustrate Death Comes for the Archbishop that would be published serially in the periodical. In Taos he was introduced to artist Barbara Latham by Victor Higgins. The couple married in May 1927. From 1928 to 1935, they traveled: to Europe, Mexico and the American South. Working for New Deal art projects, Cook produced murals for courthouses in Pittsburgh (Section of Painting and Sculpture) and Springfield, Massachusetts (Public Works of Art Project). He also produced a 16-panel fresco, The Importance of San Antonio in Texas History, in a San Antonio post office, for which he was paid $12,000 in 1937. In 1938, the couple settled near Taos on the Talpa ridge. This became their base until 1976.

In 1943 Cook was appointed to lead a World War II art unit in the Asiatic-Pacific Theater. His team accompanied the U.S. Army's 43rd Infantry Division throughout the region, including the Solomon Islands, New Hebrides and Phoenix Islands. After six months Cook returned home on a medical discharge. Drawings and watercolors from Cook's war experiences in the South Pacific were part of the touring exhibition The Army at War: A Graphic Record by American Artists (1944), sponsored by the Treasury Department.

In 1967, Cook became the first artist in the Roswell Museum and Art Center's Artist-in-Residence program. The couple started to spend their winters in Roswell, New Mexico, where they eventually moved in 1973. Due to Cook's ill health, the couple moved to Santa Fe in 1976. Cook died in 1980.

Public collections
 Metropolitan Museum of Art
 Whitney Museum of American Art
 Fogg Art Museum
 Harvard University
 Baltimore Museum of Art
 Art Institute of Chicago
 Bibliothèque Nationale de France
 British Museum
 Albuquerque Museum
 Smithsonian American Art Museum

References

Sources
 
 

1901 births
1980 deaths
20th-century American painters
American male painters
American engravers
American muralists
Artists from Santa Fe, New Mexico
Artists from Taos, New Mexico
People from Roswell, New Mexico
Public Works of Art Project artists
Section of Painting and Sculpture artists
National Academy of Design members
Art Students League of New York alumni
Artists from Massachusetts
World War II artists
20th-century American printmakers
20th-century American male artists
American war artists
20th-century engravers